Cáozhuāng (曹庄) may refer to the following locations in China:

Towns
 Caozhuang, Anhui, in Dangshan County
 Caozhuang, Liaoning, in Xingcheng
 Caozhuang, Linshu County, Shandong

Townships
 Caozhuang Township, Hebei, in Jize County
 Caozhuang Township, Shandong, in Shan County